Robert Connelly (born July 15, 1942) is a mathematician specializing in discrete geometry and rigidity theory. Connelly received his Ph.D. from University of Michigan in 1969. He is currently a professor at Cornell University.

Connelly is best known for discovering embedded flexible polyhedra. One such polyhedron is in the National Museum of American History. His recent interests include tensegrities and the carpenter's rule problem. In 2012 he became a fellow of the American Mathematical Society.

Asteroid 4816 Connelly, discovered by Edward Bowell at Lowell Observatory 1981, was named after Robert Connelly. The official  was published by the Minor Planet Center on 18 February 1992.

Author 
Connelly has authored or co-authored several articles on mathematics, including Conjectures and open questions in rigidity; A flexible sphere; and A counterexample to the rigidity conjecture for polyhedra.

References

External links
 Personal home page
 
 Cornell Mathematics Department web page (with a picture)
 Why Things Don't Fall Down – A Lecture About Tensegrity by Robert Connelly
 Mathematical Treasures of the Smithsonian Institution – Allyn Jackson, AMS Notices, vol. 46, no. 5 (May 1999), 528–534.

20th-century American mathematicians
21st-century American mathematicians
1942 births
Living people
Geometers
Differential geometers
Researchers in geometric algorithms
University of Michigan alumni
Cornell University faculty
Fellows of the American Mathematical Society